The 2019 PGA EuroPro Tour, titled as the 2019 Golfcatcher PGA EuroPro Tour for sponsorship reasons, was the 18th season of the PGA EuroPro Tour, one of four third-tier tours recognised by the European Tour.

Schedule 
The following table lists official events during the 2019 season.

Order of Merit
The Order of Merit was based on prize money won during the season, calculated in Pound sterling. The top five players on the tour (not otherwise exempt) earned status to play on the 2020 Challenge Tour.

Notes

References

2019 in golf